Takenori Hiraishi (born 26 February 1960) is a Japanese professional golfer.

Hiraishi played on the Japan Golf Tour, winning once.

Professional wins (4)

Japan Golf Tour wins (1)

Other wins (2)
1996 Kansai Open
1999 Kansai Open

Japan PGA Senior Tour wins (1)
2015 Japan Senior Open

External links

Japanese male golfers
Japan Golf Tour golfers
Sportspeople from Hyōgo Prefecture
1960 births
Living people